Víctor Tomás González (born 15 February 1985) is a Spanish retired handball player.

He played for FC Barcelona his whole career, and amongst many other titles he became Spanish champion 12 times, and won the EHF Champions League 3 times. He had to retire at the end of the season of 2019/20 due to a heart condition.

References

External links

1985 births
Living people
Spanish male handball players
Liga ASOBAL players
FC Barcelona Handbol players
Handball players at the 2008 Summer Olympics
Handball players at the 2012 Summer Olympics
Olympic handball players of Spain
Olympic bronze medalists for Spain
Olympic medalists in handball
Medalists at the 2008 Summer Olympics
Sportspeople from Barcelona
Handball players from Catalonia
21st-century Spanish people